Amyna axis, the oriental eight-spot, is a moth of the family Noctuidae. The species was first described by Achille Guenée in 1852.

Distribution
It occurs in Africa, temperate Asia, Australia and the Cook Islands. The New World population of Amyna axis was determined to be a separate species, Amyna stricta, in 2015.

The moth migrates north each year in late summer and fall.

Food plants
The larvae feed on Amaranthus, Croton, Celosia, Digera, Helianthus, Chenopodium, Spinacia, Ipomoea, Ricinus, Arachis, Crotalaria, Medicago, Phaseolus, Hibiscus, Cardiospermum, Solanum, Corchorus and Parasponia species.

It is an irregular minor pest of mung beans (Vigna radiata), black-eyed peas (Vigna unguiclata), lucerne (Medicago sativa) and soy beans (Glycine max). Its prevalence may be under reported due to the resemblance of the caterpillar with those of Chrysoieixis species.

Early stages
The larvae are thin bodied and have faint white stripes and two pairs of ventral prolegs. At low densities of groups, caterpillars are pale green. Among caterpillars at high densities, there are higher frequencies of melanistic phenotypes. The degree of blackening varied widely, ranging from individuals with simple subdorsal-lateral patches to those that were mostly black.

Larvae perch on the undersides of leaves and along stems and petioles. At rest, the abdominal segments are often looped upward. When alarmed the larva essentially jumps from the host and continues to wreathe and wriggle wildly. Prepupal larvae take on a pinkish cast. Pupation occurs in a silken cocoon below (usually) or at the soil surface. Sand and/or plant debris are interwoven into the cocoon wall.

Adult
The forewings have faint greyish-white lines and an obscure figure-of-eight mark on it. The hindwings are lighter with fainter markings. The male can be differentiated by the presence of a small semi-transparent patch on each wing.
Adults are on wing in late summer and early fall. Forewing of male with a small vesicle in cell, with a small valve of scales over it on underside, the median nervure being slightly curved. It is smaller than Amyna punctum.

References

External links

Eustrotiinae
Moths of Africa
Moths of Asia
Moths of Oceania